The 2021–22 season is FC Ingolstadt 04's 18th season in existence and the club's first season back in the 2. Bundesliga, the second tier of German football, following their promotion from the 3. Liga in the 2020–21 season. The club will also participate in the DFB-Pokal.

Background and pre-season

Ingolstadt finished 3rd in the 2020–21 3. Liga, level on points with second-placed Hansa Rostock and losing out on automatic promotion as a result of their inferior goal difference, but they did qualify for the play-offs. They won the promotion play-offs 4–3 on aggregate against VfL Osnabrück and were promoted as a result.

Pre-season

Competitions

2. Bundesliga

League table

Matches

DFB-Pokal

Transfers

Transfers in

Loans in

Transfers out

Loans out

Notes

References

Ingolstadt
FC Ingolstadt 04 seasons